Solar 1 or Solar One is the name of several solar projects including:

Power plants
 Nevada Solar One, third largest concentrated solar power plant in the world
 The Solar Project - Solar One, pilot solar-thermal project built in the Mojave Desert

Buildings
 Solar 1, self-sustaining solar powered building in New York City

Vehicles
 Solar-Powered Aircraft Developments Solar One British solar-powered aircraft